Kabutardan may refer to:
 Kabutardan, Mazandaran